Stade Boubker Ammar is a football stadium in Salé, Morocco.  It is the home stadium of Association Salé of the Botola.  The stadium holds 10,000 spectators.

External links
Stadium information 

Football venues in Morocco
Buildings and structures in Rabat-Salé-Kénitra